The Enigma is a black  polished diamond and, as of 2006, it holds the Guinness World Record as the largest cut diamond. Containing 55 facets and weighing in at 555.55 carats (111.11 grams), it was commissioned and inspired by Ran Gorenstein (Belgium) and completed in 2004 after several years of cutting and faceting.  The repetitive use of the number five in the design of the gem is intentional deriving from the hamsa, a palm-shaped amulet popular among Muslims and Jews in the Middle East and North Africa.

The Enigma is a semi-transparent carbonado with a dark brown color. These are typically referred to as black diamonds and are often reserved for industrial uses with larger specimens considered as collectors’ stones, and in fact most gem-quality stones used in contemporary jewelry design have been treated to produce the black color. A natural faceted black diamond of this size is an extremely rare occurrence.

The origin of the diamond is uncertain, but it is believed to either be the result of a meteoric impact or part of an asteroid that crashed on Earth.

In February 2022, the diamond was sold for £3.16 million to Richard Heart, the inventor of the first certificate of deposit on the blockchain called HEX. Richard renamed the diamond to "The HEX.COM diamond."

See also
 List of diamonds

References

Black diamonds
Guinness World Records